Elections to the Orkney Islands Council were held on 1 May 2003 as part of Scottish local elections. Only independent candidates contested the election. Nine seats were uncontested.

Election results

Ward results

References

Orkney
Orkney Islands Council elections